The American Adventure is the host pavilion of the World Showcase within Epcot at Walt Disney World in Bay Lake, Florida, United States. It is also the name of the Colonial American-themed pavilion's main attraction, an Audio-Animatronics stage show of American history. It is located between the Italy and Japan pavilions.

The pavilion includes a quick service food location named Regal Eagle Smokehouse, a Muppet-themed location focused on barbecue. Additionally, there is a merchandise location known as Heritage Manor which, as of February 2020, is currently closed for renovation. It will be merged with the former Art of Disney store that was located in Future World as a part of Epcot's transformation.

In 2021, Epcot announced that a new exhibit called "THE SOUL OF JAZZ: An American Adventure" will open inside of the attraction. Based on Disney and Pixar's animated film, Soul, the exhibit is part of Epcot's transformation. Guests join Joe Gardner, the star of Soul, and will be taken to New Orleans, Chicago, New York, Los Angeles, and Puerto Rico.

Layout

The pavilion is a single large building designed in the Colonial style. The building uses forced perspective to make a five-story building appear to be two and a half stories; there is a large ramp inside the attraction that slopes up, then down.

Its main attraction is The American Adventure show. The lobby is a square room that has an oval-shaped area in the middle with a dome-shaped ceiling. The walls contain quotes from famous Americans, which include Walt Disney and Charles Lindbergh, and paintings of American life throughout history representing what America is all about.  The Hall of Flags exhibit is a display of the different flags throughout U.S. history that you see as you go upstairs to the theater. In the upstairs lobby there are two more paintings of American life.  In the theater, there are 12 statues, six on each side of the theater, that are spirits of American values personified.

List of paintings

List of statues

Attraction
The American Adventure takes guests on a trip through America's history.  It is narrated by Audio-Animatronic figures of Benjamin Franklin and Mark Twain (who lived almost 100 years apart) with the voices of Dallas McKennon as Benjamin Franklin and John Anderson as Mark Twain.  The show is presented in a theater-like auditorium, with sets and characters rising out from the stage floor to represent scenes from different historical periods. The characters provide insight into American life of the past through conversations in which they discuss the current events of their time. Periods include the American Revolutionary War, the Civil War, the Centennial International Exhibition of 1876 (representing American industrialization), and the Great Depression. The presentation culminates with a musical film montage representing famous moments and people in American history from post-World War II to the present.

Changes
In 1993, the attraction was updated with all new animatronics and a new version of the theme song. In mid-2007, about 45 seconds of footage were added to the end of the Golden Dreams montage, the first updating of the montage since the 1993 renovation. The most notable addition is the brief footage of New York City Police Department/New York City Fire Department rescue crews after the September 11, 2001 attacks on the World Trade Center in 2001. The Golden Dream montage and theme song were updated again in early 2018 to feature footage of more recent notable figures, including the Obamas, Mark Zuckerberg, Madonna, and Elon Musk, among others.

Songs
 "New World Bound"  (lyrics by F. X. Atencio and Randy Bright, music by Buddy Baker)
 "In the Days of '76" (traditional)
 "Two Brothers" (lyrics and music by Irving Gordon, vocals by Ali Olmo)
 "Brother, Can You Spare a Dime?" (lyrics by E. Y. Harburg, music by Jay Gorney)
 "Golden Dream" (lyrics by Randy Bright with additional lyrics by Lynn Hart, music by Robert Moline, vocals by Richard Page and Siedah Garrett)

Theme song
The theme song for The American Adventure is "Golden Dream". The music was written by Robert Moline and the lyrics were written by show producer Randy Bright. Two versions now exist for "Golden Dream." with the original version arranged for choir and full orchestra by Don Mueller in 1980 and the arrangement heard today is a 2018 updated version by producer Harvey Mason, Jr. When speaking of the project Mason's goal was to "be respectful of the original arrangement while making it contemporary and relevant to what's going on in music today." The song gets its biggest push at the end of the attraction, during the Montage sequence of famous Americans. The song is also used as the finale to Disneyland's Great Moments with Mr. Lincoln.

The original version can be found on these releases:
The Music of Disneyland, Walt Disney World and Epcot Center (1988)
The Official Album of Disneyland and Walt Disney World (1991)
The Music of Disney: A Legacy in Song (1992)
Walt Disney World Resort: The Official Album (1999)
Walt Disney World Resort: Official Album (2000)
Official Album: Walt Disney World Resort Celebrating 100 Years of Magic (2001)

The 2018 version can be found on iTunes.

The Voices of Liberty
The Voices of Liberty is an eight-member a cappella group that hosts patriotic choral performances in the pavilion rotunda throughout the day, often as a pre-show to the next scheduled performance of the main presentation.  The group also performs in year-round events including the Candlelight Processional and other special events.

When recording or performing outside Epcot, Voices of Liberty go by the name "Liberty Voices".   Older recordings feature members of the group singing religious songs under the name "ReGeneration."   Derric Johnson is the founder/director/arranger of all the music sung by the Voices of Liberty, Liberty Voices and ReGeneration.

America Gardens Theatre

Across from the pavilion is the America Gardens Theatre, an outdoor amphitheater. The America Gardens Theatre hosts concerts, singers, and bands from around the world. Many entertainment acts from around the world perform on this stage.

The America Gardens Theatre has hosted numerous shows since it was built. Over the years some of the more famous shows include Blast! and Barrage. During the park's two major festivals—the International Flower and Garden Festival in the spring, and the International Food and Wine Festival in the fall—musical groups from the 1960s through the 1990s perform as part of each festival's concert series ("Garden Rocks" in the spring, and "Eat to the Beat" in the fall).

In 1999, a revised version of Michael Flatley's Lord of the Dance was performed in the theater over the summer. Even though Flatley himself did not perform in the show, its popularity encouraged Epcot to bring the show back in 2000 for another summer run. Originally designed as an open-air theater, partial cover and backstage dressing and show equipment areas were added during a refurbishment that was completed before the inception of the "Magical World of Barbie" stage show.

In April 2015, the American Music Machine a cappella group began performing at the America Gardens Theatre using music arranged by “Glee's” Tim Davis. The group stopped performing on September 29 2017. Their captain, Antonio Fernandez, moved on to join DCappella at the group's founding in 2018 as its vocal percussion.

Candlelight Processional

During the holiday season, the theater hosts the Candlelight Processional. This show follows in the footsteps of the show first performed in Disneyland in 1958, and which was duplicated at the Magic Kingdom in 1971. The show relocated to Epcot's America Gardens Theater in 1994. The show includes an orchestra and massed choir that perform traditional holiday songs while a guest celebrity retells the biblical story of Christmas. Some of the celebrities who have taken part in the Processional over the years include Andy Garcia, John Stamos, Marlee Matlin, Edward James Olmos, Haley Joel Osment, Susan Lucci, John O'Hurley, Jim Caviezel, Neil Patrick Harris, Whoopi Goldberg, Jodi Benson, T.D. Jakes, Pat Sajak, and Heather Graham.

Voices
Father - Charles Aidman
Mark Twain, Franklin D. Roosevelt  - John Anderson
Banjo Player - Mic Bell
Chief Joseph - Dehl Berti
Theodore Roosevelt - Bob Boyd 
Rebel Brother - Bill Boyles
Susan B. Anthony - Tricia Buttrill
Mathew Brady - Steve Cook
Thomas Jefferson - Robert Easton
Andrew Carnegie, Man in Rocking Chair - Walker Edmiston
Apple Salesman, Frederick Douglass - Al Fann
John Muir, Store Owner - Bob Holt
Benjamin Franklin, Soldier 2 - Dallas McKennon
Mother - Claudette Nevins
Jane - Patricia Parris
Alexander Graham Bell - Joe Rohde
Will Rogers - Will Rogers Jr.
Union Brother - Mark L. Taylor
Sailor - Harvey Vernon
Rosie - B. J. Ward
Soldier 1 - Frank Welker

See also
Epcot attraction and entertainment history

References

External links

Walt Disney World Resort - American Adventure Pavilion
Walt Disney World Resort - The American Adventure Attraction
All Ears Net American Adventure - A comprehensive description of The United States pavilion, including the American Adventure attraction.

Walt Disney Parks and Resorts attractions
Epcot
Audio-Animatronic attractions
World Showcase
Cultural depictions of Mark Twain
Cultural depictions of Benjamin Franklin
1982 establishments in Florida